The 2018 Tercera División play-offs to Segunda División B from Tercera División (Promotion play-offs) were the final playoffs for the promotion from 2017–18 Tercera División to 2018–19 Segunda División B. The first four teams in each group took part in the play-off.

Format
The eighteen group winners have the opportunity to be promoted directly to Segunda División B. The eighteen group winners were drawn into a two-legged series where the nine winners will promote to Segunda División B. The nine losing clubs will enter the play-off round for the last nine promotion spots.

The eighteen runners-up were drawn against one of the eighteen fourth-placed clubs outside their group and the eighteen third-placed clubs were drawn against one another in a two-legged series. The twenty-seven winners will advance with the nine losing clubs from the champions' series to determine the eighteen teams that will enter the last two-legged series for the last nine promotion spots. In all the playoff series, the lower-ranked club play at home first. Whenever there is a tie in position (e.g. like the group winners in the champions' series or the third-placed teams in the first round), a draw determines the club to play at home first.

Group Winners promotion play-off

Qualified teams

Matches

|}

Non-champions promotion play-off

First round
The teams that finished fourth in their groups are drawn against teams that finished in second place, with the latter hosting the second leg. The teams that finished third in their groups are drawn against each other.

Qualified teams

Matches

|}

Second round
The nine losers of the Group Winners promotion play-off plus the twenty-seven winners of the Non-champions promotion play-off first round will take part in this round. The teams will be matched by drawing of lots, subject to the fact that those who obtained the best position in the league face those who got worse, disputing the first match in the sports facilities of the latter and avoiding wherever it is possible that they compete among themselves clubs from the same group.

Qualified teams

Matches

|}

Third round
The eighteen winners of the previous qualifying round will be matched by drawing of lots, subject to the fact that those who obtained the best position in the league face those who got worse, disputing the first match in the sports facilities of the latter and avoiding wherever it is possible that they compete among themselves clubs from the same group.

Qualified teams

Matches

|}

See also
2018 Segunda División play-offs
2018 Segunda División B play-offs

References

External links
Playoffs at Futbolme

2017
play-offs
3